The Hurricane 5.9 is a one design racing catamaran.  It was designed by Reg White in Brightlingsea in the 1980s in response to a Tornado catamaran owner's request that White design a cat with equal or superior performance to the Tornado of roughly the same boat length and sail area that did not need to be dismantled for trailing, this was to be the Hurricane 5.9.

Now the SX rig has modernised the platform and openned the class out to a wide range of sailors and it’s low cost competitive racing in the UK

Design
Each hull is 5.9 metres long and 2.43 metres (two feet less than that of the Tornado) wide.  A second trapeze was added to for the helmsman, this was to make up for the lost righting moment with the narrower boat. At the same time, the rear of each of the 5.9 hulls was reduced to give less buoyancy than that of the Tornados to make the boats less susceptible to pitch polling when sailing downwind. The sail and spar design was also heavily updated from the Tornado's rig that had hardly changed since its launch in the 1970s.

During the 2000’s the platform was given a new rig option - the SX. Moving the mainsail to a square top Pentex sail with a higher boom fitment, a smaller self tacking jib and a new asymmetric spinnaker shape with a solid chute and evolved layout. Paired with smaller evolutions to blocks and rope systems this modernised the Hurricane platform and made the boat suit a wider range of sailors.

First use
When the first Hurricane 5.9s began racing, as their numbers were few, they would race alongside the Tornados to increase the racing numbers in one combined fleet.

Performance
The 5.9 is designed to give Tornado-like performance coupled with smooth predictable handling. In many conditions the 5.9 will actually outpace the classic Tornado. The boat is equipped with kick up rudders and centreboards which ride up on impact, reducing risk of damage. The PET film main sail gives long life and low maintenance with less frequent need for replacement. Now with the introduction of the SX rig (3 sail) the performance has been enhanced further.

Hurricane 4.9
Reg White additionally, on the back of the success of the 5.9, took the older designed 16 foot Condor catamaran and redesigned its sails, mast and boom and this new re-rigged Condor was given the name Hurricane 4.9.

Data

General

Technical

*Data from UK Hurricane Class Association

References

External links
 Yachts and yachting Hurricane-5.9-SX class page

Catamarans